Kuzbayevo (Quźbay) is a rural locality (a village) in Kuzbayevsky Selsoviet, Burayevsky District, Bashkortostan, Russia. The population was 394 as of 2010. There are 8 streets.

Geography 
Kuzbayevo is located 12 km northwest of Burayevo (the district's administrative centre) by road. Altayevo is the nearest rural locality.

References 

Rural localities in Burayevsky District